This article contains information about the literary events and publications of 1690.

Events
December 10 – Playwright Henry Nevil Payne is tortured for his role in the Montgomery Plot to restore James II to the throne — the last time a political prisoner is subjected to torture in Britain.
Colley Cibber becomes an actor with the Drury Lane company.

New books

Prose
Nicholas Barbon – A Discourse of Trade
Pierre Bayle (attributed) – Avis important aux réfugiés
Sir Thomas Browne (posthumously) – A Letter to a Friend
Antoine Furetière (posthumously) – Dictionnaire universel
John Locke
An Essay Concerning Human Understanding (dated this year but published 1689)
Two Treatises of Government
Samuel Pepys – Memoires of the Navy
Baro Urbigerus – Aphorismi Urbigerani

Drama
John Bancroft – King Edward III, with the Fall of Mortimer, Earl of March
Aphra Behn (posthumously) – The Widow Ranter
Thomas Betterton – The Prophetess, or The History of Dioclesian (adapted from Fletcher and Massinger's The Prophetess, with music by Henry Purcell)
Edmé Boursault – Esope à la ville
Roger Boyle, 1st Earl of Orrery – Mr. Anthony
John Crowne – The English Friar
John Dryden
Amphitryon, or the Two Sosias
Don Sebastian
William Mountfort – The Successful Strangers
George Powell
Alphonso, King of Naples
The Treacherous Brothers
Elkanah Settle – Distress'd Innocence, or The Princess of Persia
Thomas Shadwell – The Scourers
Thomas Southerne – Sir Anthony Love
"W. C." – The Rape Reveng'd, or the Spanish Revolution (adapted from William Rowley's All's Lost by Lust)

Poetry
Thomas D'Urfey:
Collin's Walk Through London and Westminster
New Poems
See also 1690 in poetry
Antonio Hurtado de Mendoza – Obras líricas y cómicas, divinas y humanas

Births
February 3 – Richard Rawlinson, English antiquary and cleric (died 1755)
September 12 – Peter Dens, Netherlandish theologian (died 1775)
1689/90 – Susanna Highmore, English poet (died 1750)

Deaths
March 21 – Henry Teonge, English diarist and cleric (born 1621)
May 5 – Theodore Haak, German-born English translator and natural philosopher (born 1605)
May 12 – John Rushworth, English author of Historical Collections (born c. 1612)
October 3 – Robert Barclay, Scottish Quaker writer (born c. 1648)
October 25 – Cornelius Hazart, Dutch Jesuit controversialist (born 1617)
Unknown date – Franciscus Plante, Dutch poet (born 1613)
Probable year of death – Jeremias Felbinger, German writer, teacher and lexicographer (born 1616)

References

 
Years of the 17th century in literature